The Chairman of the Board of Veterans' Appeals is a senior position within the United States Department of Veterans Affairs that is responsible for the operation and policies of the Board of Veterans' Appeals, which is the administrative tribunal within the department responsible for holding hearings and issuing decisions on behalf of the Secretary regarding veterans' claims for benefits and services.

The Chairman ranks equivalent to a department Assistant Secretary and is nominated by the President and confirmed by the Senate for a six-year term,  must be appointed as a Veterans Law Judge, and must be a licensed attorney in good standing in a state or territory.

The current Chairman is Jaime Areizaga-Soto of Virginia, who was nominated by President Joe Biden on April 25, 2022 and confirmed by the Senate on August 4, 2022. He replaced Cheryl L. Mason of Virginia, the first woman and military spouse to serve in this post and scheduled to serve until 2023, but only served through August 4, 2022 due to the confirmation of a new chairman prior to the end of her term. General Areizaga-Soto's term will expire in 2028.

History 
Beginning in 2011 and continuing up until the appointment of Chairman Mason in 2017 as the 10th Chairman and 4th politically appointed Chairman, the Board was led by several leaders appointed as the Board's Vice Chairman, which is appointed by the Secretary of VA. Although President Obama nominated former Chief Veterans Law Judge Constance B. Tobias to replace the retired James P. Terry. in the second session (2012) of the 112th Congress, as well as both the 1st (2013) and 2nd (2014) sessions of the 113th Congress, the Senate never acted on her nomination beyond a  Senate Veterans Affairs Committee confirmation hearing in November 2013,  and her nominations were returned to the President at the end of each session.

References 

United States Department of Veterans Affairs